The Pan American Badminton Championships is a tournament organized since 1977 by the Badminton Pan America (BPA) to crown the best badminton players in the Americas.
The tournament was held every year from 1977 until 1980, then every two years from 1987 until 2007. It is now organized annually, except once every four years when the Pan American Games multi-sports event is held. Badminton is part of the Pan American Games since 1995. Since then, 2007 was the only year both events (the Pan American Badminton Championships and the Pan American Games) were held simultaneously in the same year. The Pan American Badminton Championships once had a Grand Prix status.

Championships

Individual championships
Winners:

Team championships

Mixed team

Male and Female team
Pan Am Male & Female Team Cup (until 2012 the Thomas & Uber Cup Pan Am qualification)

Medal count (2007 - 2023)

Note

References

"The first Pan-American Championships", World Badminton, July–August 1977, 11.

External links
Pan American Champions

 
Badminton
Recurring sporting events established in 1977
International badminton competitions

1977 establishments in North America
1977 establishments in South America